The 2009 Tour of Britain was a UCI 2.1 category race of eight stages from 12 September till 19 September 2009. The race was the sixth edition of the latest version of the Tour of Britain and the seventieth British tour in total. It formed part of the 2008–2009 UCI Europe Tour. The race begun in Scunthorpe and ended with a circuit stage in London.

Participating teams
The 16 teams which participated in the race were:

UCI ProTour Teams
 A2R – 
 EUS – 
 GRM – 
 KAT – 
 RAB – 
 THR – 

UCI Professional Continental Teams
 BAR – 
 CTT – 
 CSF – 
 ISD – 
 TSV – 
 VAC – 
 AGR – 

UCI Continental Teams
 CTV – 
 HAF – Team Halfords Bikehut
 RCR – 
 TMB –

Stages

Stage 1
12 September 2009 – Scunthorpe to York, 

The first stage win was taken by Christopher Sutton (Garmin–Slipstream) after the peloton caught a long breakaway by Martin Mortensen (Vacansoleil) and Thomas De Gendt (Topsport Vlaanderen).

{|
|Stage 1 Result

||
|General Classification after Stage 1

|}

Stage 213 September 2009 – Darlington to Gateshead, Stage 314 September 2009 – Peebles to Gretna Green, Stage 415 September 2009 – Stanley Park, Blackpool to Blackpool, Stage 516 September 2009 – Britannia Stadium to Stoke-on-Trent, Stage 617 September 2009 – Frome to Bideford, Stage 718 September 2009 – Hatherleigh to Yeovil, Stage 819 September 2009 – Whitehall, Westminster to Whitehall, Westminster, '''

Jersey progress

References

External links

 Official Website

2009
2009 in road cycling
2009 in British sport
September 2009 sports events in the United Kingdom
2009 sports events in London